Line 16 of Wuhan Metro is a metro line in Wuhan, Hubei, China. It runs from  station in Hanyang District to  station in Hannan District.

History

Phase 1
Phase 1 of the line (from South International Expo Center to Zhoujiahe) has 7 underground stations and 5 elevated stations. Phase 1 of the line started operation on 26 December 2021.

Phase 2
Phase 2 of the line is 4.22 km in length with 2 stations. The extension opened on 30 December 2022.

Stations

References

 
Railway lines opened in 2021